Benjamin Franklin (1706–1790) was an American statesman, writer, scientist, inventor and printer.

Benjamin or Ben Franklin may also refer to:

People 
 Ben Franklin (Canadian politician) (1942–2003), former mayor of Nepean, Ontario 	
 Ben Franklin (Australian politician) (born ), a current politician in the New South Wales Legislative Council
 Benjamin Franklin (clergyman) (1812–1878), American religious leader
 Benjamin Franklin (surgeon) (1844–1917), British surgeon
 Benjamin Franklin Bowles (1869–1928) African American civil rights leader, and the founder and president of Douglass University
 Benjamin Cromwell Franklin (1805–1873), Texas state senator 
 Benjamin Joseph Franklin (1839–1898), U.S. Representative from Missouri

Ships 
 USS Franklin, name for a series of U.S. Navy vessels
 USS Benjamin Franklin, ballistic missile submarine
 Ben Franklin (PX-15), research submersible
 CMA CGM Benjamin Franklin, container cargo vessel
 Benjamin Franklin, one of the fireboats of Philadelphia, in service since 1950

Arts and literature 
 The Autobiography of Benjamin Franklin, written from 1771 to 1790
 Benjamin Franklin (2002 TV series)
 "Ben Franklin" (The Office), an episode of the television series The Office
 Benjamin Franklin, Jr., a 1943 Our Gang short comedy film
 Benjamin Franklin (miniseries), a 1974-75 American television miniseries
 Benjamin Franklin Pierce, a character from TV-series M*A*S*H, played by Alan Alda
 Benjmain Franklin (film), a two-part documentary film created by Ken Burns

Sculptures of Benjamin Franklin 

 Statue of Benjamin Franklin (Portland, Oregon), a 1931 sandstone by George Berry in Portland, Oregon, US
 Benjamin Franklin (Boyle), an 1899 bronze by John J. Boyle in Philadelphia, Pennsylvania, US
 Benjamin Franklin (Jouvenal), an 1889 Carrara marble by Jacques Jouvenal in Washington, D.C., US
 Benjamin Franklin National Memorial, a colossal statue by James Earle Fraser in Philadelphia, Pennsylvania, US
 Statue of Benjamin Franklin (San Francisco), an 1879 bronze by an unknown artist in San Francisco, California, US
 Statue of Benjamin Franklin (Stanford University), a marble by Antonio Frilli in Stanford, California, US

Other 
 "Ben Franklin", a song by Snail Mail from Valentine
 Benjamin Franklin ($100), a nickname for the United States one hundred-dollar bill
 Ben Franklin (company), a variety-store chain 
 Ben Franklin, Texas, an unincorporated community in Delta County
 Benjamin Franklin Bridge, between Philadelphia, Pennsylvania and Camden, New Jersey
 Benjamin Franklin Parkway, Philadelphia, Pennsylvania
 Ben Franklin Place, a building in Ottawa named after the former Mayor of Nepean
 Benjamin Franklin's phonetic alphabet
 Benjamin Miles "C-Note" Franklin, fictional prisoner and ex-soldier  in the series Prison Break
 Benjamin Franklin Rodriguez, the main character from the second cinematic of The Sandlot

See also 
 Benjamin Franklin Bache (surgeon) (1801–1881), U.S. Navy surgeon
 Benjamin Franklin Bache (1769–1798), American journalist
 Benjamin Franklin School (disambiguation)